is a railway station in the city of Noshiro, Akita, Japan, operated by the East Japan Railway Company (JR East).

Lines

Station layout
The station consists of one ground-level side platform serving a single bidirectional line. The station is staffed.

History
The station opened on 25 January 1952. With the privatization of the Japanese National Railways on 1 April 1987, it came under the operational control of JR East.

Passenger statistics
In fiscal 2018, the station was used by an average of 30 passengers daily (boarding passengers only).

Surrounding area
 Akita Prefectural Noshiro Nishi High School

References

External links

 JR East station information 

Railway stations in Japan opened in 1952
Mukai-Nishiro Station
Gonō Line
Noshiro, Akita